List of African dependencies and other territories — including their respective capitals:

External territories

France 
  — Saint Pierre, Réunion
 Crozet Islands — Alfred Faure
 Kerguelen Islands — Port-aux-Français
 Saint Paul and Amsterdam Islands — Martin-de-Viviès
 Scattered Islands — Saint Pierre, Réunion
 Bassas da India — N/A
 Europa Island — N/A
 Glorioso Islands — N/A
 Banc du Geyser — N/A
 Juan de Nova Island — N/A
 Tromelin Island — N/A

United Kingdom 
  — Camp Justice
  — Jamestown
  — Georgetown
  — Jamestown
  — Edinburgh of the Seven Seas
  Gough Island — N/A

Internal territories

France 
  — Mamoudzou
  — Saint Denis

Italy 
  — Palermo
 
  Pelagie Islands
 Lampedusa
 Lampione
 Linosa

 A.A continental island on the African Plate, Sicily is geologically a part of Africa, but geopolitically a part of Europe.

Portugal 
  — Funchal
  Savage Islands — N/A

South Africa 
  Prince Edward Islands — N/A

Spain 
  — Las Palmas de Gran Canaria and Santa Cruz de Tenerife
  — Las Palmas de Gran Canaria
  — Santa Cruz de Tenerife
  — Ceuta
  — Melilla
  Plazas de soberanía — N/A

Tanzania 
  — Zanzibar City

Condominium 

  — Abyei Town

Terra nullius 

  — N/A

Disputed territories 

 
 
 
 
  Free Zone — Tifariti (de facto) / Laayoune (claimed)
  Southern Provinces
 Dakhla-Oued Ed-Dahab — Dakhla
 Guelmim-Oued Noun — Guelmim
 Laâyoune-Sakia El Hamra — Laayoune

 A.Lies completely within the disputed territory of Western Sahara.

 B.Located in the disputed territory of Western Sahara.

 C.Lies partly within the disputed territory of Western Sahara.

 D.Located outside the disputed territory of Western Sahara.

 E.Lies mostly within the disputed territory of Western Sahara.

Political status

See also
 Autonomous communities of Spain
 Autonomous Regions of Portugal
 British Overseas Territories
 Dependent territories in Africa
 Overseas department and region
 Overseas territory (France)
 Political status of Western Sahara
 Provinces of Spain
 Regions of Italy

Notes 

dependen
Dependent territories in Africa
European colonisation in Africa
Dependencies